Homoeocera acuminata is a moth of the subfamily Arctiinae first described by Francis Walker in 1856. It is found in Paraná, Brazil.

References

Euchromiina
Moths described in 1874